Anise drinks is a family of alcoholic beverages with defining characteristics such as:
Strong flavour of anise
High concentration of alcohol
Crystallization and colour changing when mixed with other liquids (ouzo effect)

Varieties include:

 Absinthe, a drink popular throughout Europe
 Aguardiente (only Colombian Aguardiente)
 Aquavit, a spirit popular in Scandinavia
 Anis, popular in Spain. Two varieties: "seco" or dry and "dulce" which is more sweet.
 Arak, the traditional alcoholic beverage of the Levant (Syria, Lebanon, Jordan, Israel and Palestine) as well as Iraq and Egypt
 Areqe, a traditional grain alcoholic beverage of Ethiopia
 Mastika, a drink in the Balkans
 Ouzo, a Greek aperitif
 Pastis, an apéritif in France
 Rakı, a Turkish drink
 Sambuca, a liqueur in Italy
 Xtabentún, a liqueur from Mexico

See also
 Flavored liquor (no sugar)
 List of liqueurs#Anise-flavored liqueurs (with sugar)
 List of alcoholic drinks#Seed or botanical distillations

 
Cocktails with liqueur